Vidaurre may refer to:

People
Antonio Vidaurre (1724–1780), Spanish painter, poet and writer
José Antonio Vidaurre (1798–1837), Chilean military officer who led a failed insurrection in 1837
José Milla y Vidaurre (1822–1882), Guatemalan writer
Violeta Vidaurre (1928–2021), Chilean actress

Geography
Vidaurre Rock, a rock which breaks the surface at low water east of Acuna Rocks in the Duroch Islands, Trinity Peninsula

See also
Estadio Carlos Vidaurre García, a multi-use stadium in Tarapoto, Peru
Estadio Municipal Carlos Vidaurre García, a multi-use stadium in Tarapoto, Peru
Vadaure, Nepal
Vidarte, a surname
Vidura, a character in the Mahabharata